David C. Williams is an American film composer.

Career
He earned his Bachelor of Music degree from Southwest Missouri State University and his Master of Music from the University of North Texas College of Music, then later took classes with Academy Award winning composer John Corigliano.

Williams worked on films such as No Way Back,  Supernova, Phantoms and The Prophecy, the latter using a theme he created for all the film's sequels. He scored the action film Give 'Em Hell, Malone.

External links
 
 Official Site

Living people
American film score composers
American male film score composers
People from Macomb, Illinois
University of North Texas College of Music alumni
Year of birth missing (living people)